O'Dayne Valentin Richards (born 14 December 1988 in St. Andrew) is a Jamaican athlete competing in the shot put and discus throw. He studied at the University of Technology, Jamaica.

Achievements

Personal bests
Outdoor
 Shot Put – 21.96 (Rabat 2017)
 Discus Throw – 58.31 (Kingston 2012)
Indoor
 Shot Put – 19.93 (Birmingham 2018)

References

External links 
 
 
 

1986 births
Living people
Athletes (track and field) at the 2015 Pan American Games
Jamaican male shot putters
Athletes (track and field) at the 2014 Commonwealth Games
Athletes (track and field) at the 2018 Commonwealth Games
People from Saint Andrew Parish, Jamaica
World Athletics Championships athletes for Jamaica
World Athletics Championships medalists
Athletes (track and field) at the 2016 Summer Olympics
Olympic athletes of Jamaica
Commonwealth Games gold medallists for Jamaica
Pan American Games gold medalists for Jamaica
Commonwealth Games medallists in athletics
Pan American Games medalists in athletics (track and field)
Universiade medalists in athletics (track and field)
Competitors at the 2018 Central American and Caribbean Games
Central American and Caribbean Games gold medalists for Jamaica
Universiade gold medalists for Jamaica
Jamaican Athletics Championships winners
Central American and Caribbean Games medalists in athletics
Medalists at the 2011 Summer Universiade
Medalists at the 2015 Pan American Games
20th-century Jamaican people
21st-century Jamaican people
Medallists at the 2014 Commonwealth Games